Talagang  is a city and the headquarters of the Talagang District located in Punjab, Pakistan. Talagang is commonly known as land of Gazi and Martyrs. Old name of Talagang was Awan Mahal. This name was given to honour Awan tribe. The Awan believe themselves to be the descendants of Ali ibn Abu Talib and that gives them "high status in the Indian Muslim environment".

References

External links
 Municipal Committee Talagang at Local Government and Community Development Department

Populated places in Talagang District
Cities in Punjab (Pakistan)